Power of Evil (also known as Paradigm) is a 1985 French-German-Italian drama film written and directed by Krzysztof Zanussi.

Cast 

 Vittorio Gassman: Gottfried 
 Marie-Christine Barrault: Sylvie 
 Benjamin Völz: Hubert 
 Raf Vallone: Laboratory director  
 Erika Wackernagel: Mutter 
 Hans-Werner Marquardt: Alexander 
 Hark Bohm: Notar

References

External links

1985 films
West German films
Films directed by Krzysztof Zanussi
Films scored by Wojciech Kilar
1985 drama films
German drama films
French drama films
Italian drama films
1980s French films
1980s Italian films
1980s German films